Breath of Heaven: A Christmas Collection is the second Christmas album from American country music artist Vince Gill. It was released in 1998 on MCA Nashville. The album was recorded with the Patrick Williams Orchestra.

Track listing
"Winter Wonderland" (Felix Bernard, Richard B. Smith) - 3:21
"The Christmas Song" (Mel Torme, Bob Wells) - 4:16
"O Little Town of Bethlehem" (Phillips Brooks, Lewis Redner) - 4:06
"Silver Bells" (Ray Evans, Jay Livingston) - 3:32
"It's the Most Wonderful Time of the Year" (Edward Pola, George Wyle) - 2:45
"Blue Christmas" (Billy Hayes, Jay W. Johnson) - 3:48
"O Holy Night" (Adolphe Adam, John Sullivan Dwight) - 4:34
"Let It Snow! Let It Snow! Let It Snow!" (Sammy Cahn, Jule Styne) - 2:48
"A Cradle in Bethlehem" (Alfred Bryan, Larry Stock) - 4:12
"Breath of Heaven (Mary's Song)" (Chris Eaton, Amy Grant) - 5:57
"O Come All Ye Faithful" (Frederick Oakeley, John Francis Wade) - 2:57

Personnel 

 Vince Gill – lead vocals
 Michael Lang – acoustic piano
 Michael Omartian – keyboards, percussion
 George Doering – guitars
 Dean Parks – guitars 
 Chuck Berghofer – bass
 Gregg Field – drums
 Larry Bunker – percussion
 Gene Puerling – arrangements (3)
 Patrick Williams – arrangements (7, 11)

The Patrick Williams Orchestra

 Patrick Williams – arrangements and conductor 
 Endre Granat – concertmaster
 Joe Soldo – contractor 
 Bill Baker – music preparation 
 Curt Berg – music preparation 
 Jonathan Barrack Griffiths – music preparation 
 Clyde Hoggan – music preparation 
 Ralph Mullins – music preparation 
 Daniel Perito – music preparation 
 Marion Sherrill – music preparation 
 David Wells – music preparation 
 Terry Woodson – music preparation 

Brass and woodwind section

 Rick Baptist– trumpet
 Wayne Bergeron – trumpet
 Jon Clarke – flute, oboe
 Gary Foster – clarinet, flute
 Larry Hall– trumpet
 Charles Loper – trombone
 Warren Luening – trumpet
 Barbara Northcutt – oboe
 David Shostac – flute
 Phil Teele – bass trombone
 Bill Watrous – trombone
 Chauncey Welsch – trombone 
 Angela Wiegand – flute

String section

 Bob Becker – viola
 Julie Berghofer – harp
 Robert Brosseau – violin
 Belinda Broughton – violin
 Darius Campo – violin
 Matthew Cooker – cello
 Mario DeLeón – violin
 Marcia Dickstein – harp
 Assa Drori – violin
 Steve Erdody – cello
 Donald V. Ferrone – double bass
 Kristin Fife – violin
 Ronald Folsom – violin
 Suzanna Giordano – viola
 Mimi Granat – viola
 Keith Greene – viola
 Larry Greenfield – violin
 Gwenn Heller – violin
 Amy Hershberger – violin
 Oscar Hidalgo – double bass
 Sarah Knutson – violin
 Laura Kuennen-Poper – viola
 Armin Ksajikian – cello
 Natalie Leggett – violin
 Carolyn Osborn – violin
 Bob Sanov – violin
 John Scanlon – viola
 Harry Shirinian – viola
 Christina Soule – cello
 David Speltz – cello
 David Stenske – violin
 Ray Tischer – viola
 Cecilia Tsan – cello
 Jennifer Walton – violin
 Miwako Watanabe – violin

Backing vocalists

 Steve Amerson – backing vocals (3)
 Morgan Ames – backing vocals (3)
 Amick Byram – backing vocals (3, 9, 11)
 Alvin Chea – backing vocals (3, 11)
 Randy Crenshaw – backing vocals (9, 11)
 Donna Davidson – backing vocals (3, 7, 9, 11)
 Ian Freebarin-Smith – backing vocals (3)
 Debbie Hall – backing vocals (3, 7, 9, 11)
 Sandie Hall – backing vocals (3, 7, 9, 11)
 Walt Harrah – backing vocals (3, 11)
 Terry Harriton – backing vocals (3)
 Ron Hicklin – backing vocals (3)
 Luana Jackman –  (7, 9, 11)
 Bob Joyce – backing vocals (3, 9, 11)
 Edie Lehmann Boddicker – backing vocals (3, 7, 9, 11)
 Rick Logan –  (9, 11)
 Melissa Mackay – backing vocals (3, 7, 9, 11)
 Gene Merlino – backing vocals (3)
 Bobbi Page – backing vocals (3)
 Don Shelton – backing vocals (3, 9, 11)
 Sally Stevens – vocal contractor, backing vocals (3, 7, 9, 11)
 Susie Stevens-Logan – backing vocals (7, 9, 11)
 Mervyn Warren – backing vocals (3, 11)
 John West – backing vocals (3, 9, 11)
 Ann White – backing vocals (3)

Production 
 Tony Brown – producer 
 Michael Omartian – producer 
 Al Schmitt – recording, mixing at Capitol Studios, Hollywood, California
 Terry Christian – overdub recording at Seventeen Grand Recording, Nashville, Tennessee, additional recording 
 Hank Nirider – additional overdub recording, assistant engineer 
 Peter Doell – assistant engineer 
 Steve Genewick – assistant engineer 
 Bill Smith – assistant engineer 
 Denny Purcell – mastering at Georgetown Masters, Nashville, Tennessee
 Jessie Noble – project coordinator 
 Lisa Jurowski – project coordinator
 Jim McGuire – photography

Charts

Weekly charts

Year-end charts

References 

1998 Christmas albums
Vince Gill albums
MCA Records albums
Albums produced by Tony Brown (record producer)
Albums produced by Michael Omartian
Christmas albums by American artists
Country Christmas albums
Albums recorded at Capitol Studios